Tirupati bus station is a bus station located in Tirupati city of the Indian state of Andhra Pradesh. It is owned by Andhra Pradesh State Road Transport Corporation. It operates buses to all parts of the State and to nearby cities in Tamil Nadu, Karnataka, Telangana.

Structure

There are three mini bus stations in the Tirupati Central bus station complex with a total of 69 platforms in 12 acres. The Srihari bus station, formerly known as Central bus station, is utilized for eastern services. The Srinivasa bus station is for west-bound destinations. The Saptagiri link bus station, renamed Yedukondala bus station, is utilized for services to Tirumala.

Tirupati bus stand had a fleet of 1500 buses with nearly 3900 daily trips. It carries on an average of 1.3 lakh passengers per day during normal days which makes it one of the busiest bus-stands.

References

Bus stations in Andhra Pradesh
Tirupati
Transport in Tirupati